is a Japanese manga series. It is written and illustrated by Leiji Matsumoto, later adapted into a number of anime films and television series. It is set in a spacefaring, high-tech future in which humans have learned how to transfer their minds and emotions with perfect fidelity into mechanical bodies, thus achieving practical immortality.

The manga won the Shogakukan Manga Award for shōnen in 1978. The anime series won the Animage Anime Grand Prix prize in 1981.

Matsumoto was inspired to create Galaxy Express 999 by the idea of a steam train running through the stars in the novel Night on the Galactic Railroad by Kenji Miyazawa.

Plot

Anime and manga

An impoverished ten-year-old named Tetsuro Hoshino desperately wants an indestructible machine body, giving him the ability to live forever and have the freedom that the unmechanized do not have. While machine bodies are impossibly expensive, they are supposedly given away for free in the Andromeda Galaxy, the end of the line for the Galaxy Express 999, a space train that only comes to Earth once a year.

The series begins with Tetsuro and his mother making their way to Megalopolis where they hope to get jobs to pay for passes for the 999. Along the way, however, Count Mecha and a gang of "human hunters" kill Tetsuro's mother. Before she dies, she tells him to continue the journey they started, and to get a machine body to live the eternal life she could not. Tetsuro tries to forge on toward the city alone, but is quickly overcome by the brutal cold and wind. As he succumbs, he cries out an apology to his mother for failing to fulfill her wish, and hopes that in his next life he will be born as a robot to begin with.

Tetsuro is surprised to awaken by the fireplace in the home of a beautiful woman, Maetel, who is the spitting image of his dead mother. Maetel tells him she had heard the entire incident with a long-range directional microphone she had been idly scanning around the area with. Maetel offers him an unlimited use pass for the 999 if he will be her traveling companion, to which Tetsuro agrees. She provides him with a gun and directs him to the Count's residence, telling him that the Count and his henchmen will be too distracted with their revelries to defend themselves against a surprise attack. Tetsuro bursts in on them in their meeting hall and cuts them down with a spray of gunfire. With the Earth police in hot pursuit, Tetsuro and Maetel flee the planet aboard the 999.

Along the way, Tetsuro has many adventures on many different and exotic planets and meets many kinds of people, both human and alien, living and machine. Increasingly, Tetsuro realizes that a machine body will not fix all of his problems. In fact, most of the machine people he meets regret the decision to give up their humanity.

Eventually, Tetsuro and Maetel reach the Planet Prometheum, the final stop for the 999. He is shocked by the cruelty and indolence of the machine people there, and witnesses a mechanized human committing suicide, an event to which the others react with scoffs and derision. He asks the dying man why he wished to end his life, and is told that eternal life on Prometheum is utterly empty of joy or purpose. When Tetsuro mentions the name of his traveling companion, the man is horrified and tells him that Maetel is in fact the daughter of Queen Prometheum, the supreme ruler of the Machine Empire, and that she is thoroughly untrustworthy. Tetsuro is outraged at having been kept in the dark and rushes off to confront Maetel. Maetel is at a loss for words, but a government spokeswoman inserts herself into their conversation and begins giving answers on Maetel's behalf. Tetsuro is not impressed and he storms off in a blind fury.

Tetsuro does not understand why he has been betrayed by Maetel, but Maetel has plans of her own, and seeks to destroy the mechanized civilization. With the help of her father, Dr. Ban (only named in the film), whose consciousness resides in a pendant she wears around her neck, Maetel destroys her mother and the planet. Afterwards, Maetel and Tetsuro return to the penultimate station on the Planet of Bats where Tetsuro tells Maetel his intention to return to Earth and lead it toward a new future.

Maetel, proud of Tetsuro for his decision to reject mechanization, tells him she has something to take care of and that he should board first. However, Tetsuro finds a letter from Maetel telling him that it was time for them to part ways. Maetel had secretly boarded the 777 (three-seven), a nearby train, with the intention of "leading another boy to his future". However, it is unclear as to whether or not this means that the Mechanization Empire still exists elsewhere, or if Maetel will lead the boy to some other "future". The series ends as the trains both depart the Planet of Bats.

Film versions

Galaxy Express 999

The film version of Galaxy Express 999, released in 1979. Maetel and Tetsuro again set out for the home planet of the Mechanized Empire, visiting four planets. Planet Maetel is a mechanized world where machine bodies are made.

Godiego performed the film's theme song "The Galaxy Express 999".

Adieu Galaxy Express 999
Adieu Galaxy Express 999 is a 1981 sequel to the film adaptation. Adieu presents an entirely new storyline which takes place three years after the destruction of Planet Maetel. The Machine Empire now has even more of a stranglehold over the Galaxy. Rumors are afoot of Maetel becoming its new Queen. Tetsuro, now a fifteen-year-old freedom fighter, is shocked when a messenger brings him news that the 999 is returning, and that Maetel wants him to board it. Tetsuro narrowly makes his way to the 999 and departs Earth, now a battlefield.

Although Tetsuro finds that Maetel is not present on the 999, he does meet Metalmena, a machine woman who has replaced the waitress Claire. Also, a mysterious Ghost Train has been traveling the universe and nearly crashes into the 999. The 999 then pouts about the humiliation of being overtaken by the Ghost Train. The 999 heads to the planet La Metal, portrayed here as the birthplace of Prometheum and Maetel. Here Tetsuro helps in the resistance, befriending a cat-like teenaged-boy named Meowdar.  While exploring the ruins of an old castle, Tetsuro discovers a portrait of a beautiful, blonde queen who looks very much like Maetel. He learns that it is, in fact, La Metal's Queen Prometheum, even though she looks nothing like she did at their last confrontation. As the 999 departs, Maetel finally makes her appearance.

Shortly after leaving La Metal, the 999 is forced to dock at a station where Tetsuro meets a mysterious machine-man named Faust. When Tetsuro attacks him, Faust causes Tetsuro to drop into a flashback where he must relive his mother's death. The 999 continues on to the planet Mosaic, the last stop before Great Andromeda, capital of the mechanized empire. Here Tetsuro finds the Ghost Train and is nearly killed.

The 999 finally makes its way to Great Andromeda where Faust greets Tetsuro once more. Meanwhile, Maetel travels down to the center of the planet where Prometheum's consciousness still exists. Maetel is put in charge of the mechanized empire, just as the rumors said. But, again, she intends to put an end to the operations, and attempts to shut Prometheum's machinery down. She reveals the horrible truth to Tetsuro that the energy the machine people use is actually drained from living human beings, and that they were transported there by the Ghost Train. Tetsuro is shocked to find his old friend Meowdar among a pile of dead, drained bodies. Metalmena shows indifference to Meowdar's death, until Tetsuro reveals the source of the energy she has been existing on. As a patrol of guards comes to arrest the group, Metalmena, disgusted and enraged by what she has learned, attacks and destroys them, apparently at the cost of her own life.

Prometheum proves that she cannot be killed with just the flip of a switch, and all seems hopeless. At about the same time, a space anomaly called Siren the Witch approaches Great Andromeda, attracted to its abundant energy and absorbing all machine energy. With Great Andromeda collapsing, the 999 is set to depart, but Tetsuro must face Faust one last time. After dealing Faust a fatal blow, it is revealed to Tetsuro that Faust is actually Tetsuro's father (In the manga and television series, it is never made clear what became of Tetsuro's father). The 999 heads back to La Metal where Maetel and Tetsuro separate for the last time, and "the boy [Tetsuro] becomes a man".

Two songs written and performed by Mary MacGregor, 'Love Light' and the ending theme "Sayonara" were used for the film. Kumiko Kaori recorded a Japanese version of the ending song.

Helen McCarthy in 500 Essential Anime Movies called it a "dense, fascinating story".

New manga series and Eternal Fantasy
In 1996, Matsumoto began a new GE999 series, set a year after the original, in which the Earth is destroyed and Tetsuro sets out to discover the source of the "darkness" that threatens all life in the universe.

The film Galaxy Express 999: Eternal Fantasy was released in 1998. This film takes place a few years after the events of Adieu Galaxy Express 999 (2nd anime) and is the third film in the anime series, where Maetel and Tetsuro reunite to save the universe again from another evil. It also serves as a link between this film and The Galaxy Railways.

The Alfee performed the theme song "Brave Love: Galaxy Express 999 / Beyond the Win".

Also, Space Battleship Yamato, from the Japanese show of the same name and the English version Star Blazers, which are both Matsumoto creations, makes a cameo appearance

The manga has been partially published in English by Viz. The film was released by Discotek Media on DVD on October 16, 2012 and Blu-ray in 2020. The latter will include a newly produced English dub by Sound Cadence Studios in Dallas, Texas with a new cast.

Maetel Legend

This two-part OVA from 2000 serves as a prelude for Galaxy Express 999 and explains the series' backstory. Maetel, the protagonist, is the daughter of Queen Prometheum of the Planet La Metal (both from Queen Millennia), a wandering planet, and one of the first civilizations to have mechanized their bodies. As Queen Promethium becomes fearful of the natural decline of her people's lifespan on their freezing world, which has fallen out of orbit, she decides to mechanize them all,  in order to enable her people to survive the harsh climate. The complete series was released on DVD by Central Park Media.

Space Symphony Maetel

Following on from Maetel Legend, this 13-part OVA from 2004 reveals that the newly created machine people of La Metal began to mechanise galaxy after galaxy against the will of many humans, and ended up creating rebellions and revolutions. Maetel is asked to return to La Metal to succeed her mother, only to discover the many hardships her mother has inflicted on the humans.

In this series, Captain Harlock and Emeraldas (Maetel's sister) also appear, and work together to assassinate Prometheum, along with Maetel. Parallels with Galaxy Express 999 are prevalent. Instead of a boy who wants a mechanized body meeting her, she met a boy who has a grudge against Prometheum and detests being mechanized.

The final lines of dialog reveal that this is a prequel to the 1979 film Galaxy Express 999.

Galaxy Railways: Letter from the Abandoned Planet
This OVA series was released from December 30, 2006 to January 5, 2007 (on SKY PerfectTV!) in Japan. The story takes place between Seasons 1 and 2 of Galaxy Railways: Crossroad to Eternity, and presumably after the events of Galaxy Express 999: Eternal Fantasy, where the Earth has since been destroyed. The OVAs featured Maetel, Tetsuro, and the Conductor, with their original voice actors from the Galaxy Express 999 television series.

For unknown reasons, this series started production earlier than Galaxy Railways: Crossroad to Eternity, but was aired much later.

Galaxy Express 999 Another Story: Ultimate Journey
A manga re-telling of the original manga illustrated by Yuzuru Shimazaki began serialization in Akita Shoten's Champion Red magazine on March 19, 2018. The manga was part of a project celebrating Matsumoto's 80th birthday.

Characters
: The main character of Galaxy Express 999, Tetsuro is a poor Earth boy who witnessed his mother die at the hands of Count Mecha. With his mother's dying wish being for him to obtain a machine body, Tetsuro embarks on the Galaxy Express with Maetel. Tetsuro has also been mentioned in the 2014 Captain Harlock: Dimensional Voyage manga.
: The mysterious blonde woman who accompanies Tetsuro on the Galaxy Express 999. Maetel is in actuality the daughter of Queen Prometheum, ruler of the mechanized empire. In the movie version, Maetel is responsible for bringing youths from around the universe to the mechanized homeworld where they are turned into mechanized human components to serve the mechanized empire, whereas in the television series, she is grooming them to grow up to become generals in her mother's imperial military. Maetel is secretly plotting with her father, Dr. Ban (who is contained within the pendant around her neck) to destroy the machine empire, and finally does so (in the movie) when it is Tetsuro's turn to be turned into a bolt. Maetel's soul exists in the body of a human copy, which she occupies until it grows old and she exchanges it for a new one. It is explained in the movie version that she occupies a clone of the body of Tetsuro's mother, which explains the resemblance between the two.
: The Conductor is the main crew member of the Galaxy Express 999. He is an alien being with an invisible body; only his eyes can be seen while he is wearing his conductor uniform. The Conductor prefers to go 'strictly by the book' and frequently cites the Galaxy Express rule book, but occasionally ends up bending the rules and getting into adventures with Tetsuro and Maetel.
: The dining car waitress on the 999, Claire has a machine body made of clear crystal glass. Unlike others who gave up their humanity by choice, Claire was forced into this existence by her vain mother. She works on the 999 in order to save up enough money to buy back her human body, which is stored on Pluto. Claire quickly befriends Tetsuro and sacrifices herself for him when a hallucination taking the guise of his mother tries to pull him out of the train. Her body is shattered, all that remains is a single glass tear which Tetsuro holds with him as a memento. In the movie version, Claire has a somewhat larger role, but suffers the same fate, sacrificing herself for Tetsuro when Prometheum tries to kill him (a machine girl named "Mirai" ("Future") has this role in the television series). Claire returns to life in both Eternal Fantasy and the new Galaxy Express manga published by Matsumoto in the 1990s.
 and : Famous space pirates who are idolized by Tetsuro. Both have only minor cameos in the original manga and television series, but have significantly larger roles in the movies and assist in defeating the machine empire.
: A well known bandit who sneaks aboard the 999 after their stop on the planet Titan. Antares despises machine people for the death of his wife and has many unexploded bullets lodged within his abdomen. He warns Tetsuro to "shoot first, ask questions later". In the manga and television series he lives in a large home with his many children; in the movie he lives on Titan with other bandits and many children orphaned by Count Mecha. In the movie version he assists Tetsuro in his quest to kill Count Mecha at the Time Castle, and is killed when the bullets in his body explode after taking multiple shots from the Count.
: The wealthy machine man who murdered Tetsuro's mother. In the manga and television series, he is a minor aristocrat, and is killed by Tetsuro before he leaves Earth. In the movie version he appears to have considerably more power, and rules the Time Castle. Acquiring a machine body to get revenge on Count Mecha is Tetsuro's primary motivation in the movie version, and he accomplishes his goal with the assistance of Antares while on the planet Heavy Melder.
: Maetel's mother, and ruler of the mechanized empire. Once a gentle woman, Prometheum created the machine empire believing it would be good for humanity. Prometheum has considerably difference physical characteristics in each of her appearances, appearing as a humanoid in the television series and movie, and a two-faced head in the manga. Prometheum is destroyed with the destruction of Andromeda in the manga and television series, and killed by Claire in the movie version. Her spirit occupies the planet Great Andromeda in Adieu Galaxy Express 999 but perishes when that planet is destroyed by Siren the Witch.

English-language versions
In 1980, Roger Corman produced an English-language dub of the first Galaxy Express 999 movie. The movie changed the character names (for example changing Tetsuro to Joey and Harlock to Warlock), and removed approximately 30 minutes of content. Antonia Levi, the author of Samurai from Outer Space said that the edited film, released by New World Pictures, was "heavily edited" and that "many otaku consider it too damaged to watch."

In 1986, Harmony Gold produced rarely seen English dubs of two of the GE999 television specials, Galaxy Express 999: Can You Live Like a Warrior? and Galaxy Express 999: Can You Love Like a Mother?

In the late 1980s the Tv series only aired with English subtitles on Nippon Golden Network.

The first movie was dubbed into English again in 1996 by Viz, titled Galaxy Express 999: The Signature Edition. Released on VHS, this dub was produced by Ocean Studios in Vancouver, British Columbia, and was more true to the source material. Viz also released Adieu, Galaxy Express 999 subbed and dubbed on VHS. They were never released on R1 DVD by the company. For years, the only official English-language release of Galaxy Express 999 material on DVD were a  Korean release of the two movies which utilizes Viz's subtitle scripts. The English dubs of both films were run regularly on the Canadian channel Space in 1997 and 1998. They were also run in a very heavily edited form on the American Sci-Fi Channel.

Viz later released five volumes of the second Galaxy Express manga, which was the basis for the third film, Galaxy Express 999: Eternal Fantasy. The original manga has yet to be officially translated into English.

A subtitled version of the television series was available on IGN's Direct2Drive service. The streaming website Crunchyroll began streaming a subtitled version on January 9, 2009.

DVD versions of both Galaxy Express 999 and Adieu, Galaxy Express 999 were released in the United States on June 28, 2011 by Discotek Media. Both DVD's feature the English subbed and dubbed (Viz dub) versions of the movies. Discotek also released "Eternal Fantasy" on DVD on October 16, 2012. It is in Japanese only, but with English subtitles. A Blu-ray release with a newly produced English dub was released in 2020. This dub was produced by Sound Cadence Studios in Dallas, Texas with a new cast.

The television series was licensed for a subtitled North American home video release by S'more Entertainment in 2012 as one their first anime releases.

During Otakon 2018 on August 12, Discotek Media announced three Blu-ray sets for the entire show in the coming months. Discotek Media's releases will contain a new upscale that preserves more detail and grain, in contrast to Toei Company's Blu-ray Boxes that showed smeared colors to make the picture look smooth. Discotek's first collection, titled Departure, which contains episodes 1-39, was released on December 24, 2019, followed by Layover on July 28, 2020, which contains episodes 40-76 and includes the TV Special Can You Live Like a Warrior?, whose Harmony Gold dub has been restored for this release. The third collection Terminus was released on September 29, 2020. It contained episodes 77-113 along with TV Specials Eternal Wanderer Emeraldas and Can You Love Like a Mother?, the latter's dub also being restored.

Publication history
 First manga series, serialized in Shōnen King (Shōnen Gahosha), 1977–1981
 New manga series, serialized in Big Gold (Shogakukan), 1996–??
 TV series, 113 episodes + 4 TV specials (1978)
 Television specials, Can You Live Like A Warrior (1979), Emeraldes the Eternal Wanderer (1980) and Can You Love Like a Mother (1980)
 Film, Galaxy Express (1979)
 Featurette, Galaxy Express 999 Glass no Clair – Glass-made Claire (1980)
 Film, Adieu Galaxy Express 999 Terminus Andromeda – Sayonara Galaxy Express 999 (1981)
 Film, Galaxy Express 999 ~Eternal Fantasy~ (1998)
 TV series, Space Symphony Maetel, 13 episodes (2004–2005)

Cast

Video games
The Nintendo DS and PlayStation games were not released outside Japan.

Game designer Fumito Ueda cited Galaxy Express 999 as an inspiration behind his video game Ico (2001), which was influenced by the manga's relationship involving a woman who is a guardian for the young hero as they adventure through the galaxy.

Appearances in media
 The anime was referenced in the song "Express 999" by South Korean female group Girls' Generation from their fourth Korean studio album I Got a Boy.
 Galaxy Express 999 was mentioned in late Korean idol Sulli's song "On the Moon".

Explanatory notes

References

External links

 Galaxy Express 999 and Space Battleship Yamato statues in Tsuruga 
 All 113 Episodes of Galaxy Express 999 at Crunchyroll
 

1977 manga
1978 anime television series debuts
1981 anime films
1998 anime films
2000 anime OVAs
2004 anime television series debuts
Akita Shoten manga
Animated space adventure films
Animated space adventure television series
Discotek Media
Fiction about intergalactic travel
Fiction about rail transport
Fictional trains
Films directed by Rintaro
Films scored by Kohei Tanaka
Fuji TV original programming
Funimation
Japanese animated science fiction films
New World Pictures films
Prosthetics in fiction
Seinen manga
Shogakukan franchises
Shogakukan manga
Shōnen Gahōsha manga
Shōnen manga
Space opera anime and manga
Toei Animation films
Toei Animation original video animation
Toei Animation television
Trains in fiction
Transhumanism in anime and manga
Viz Media manga
Winners of the Shogakukan Manga Award for shōnen manga